Cullinane v McGuigan is a cited case in New Zealand regarding the requirement under section 7(4)(b) of the Contractual Remedies Act 1979 that a breach of contract must be "substantial" for a contract to be cancelled, and that "substantial" was not limited to a comparison of monetary values.

Background
The Cullinanes in 1995 auctioned their unfinished Christchurch house, that due to matrimonial problems, had remained an unfinished shell since 1991.

On the day of the auction, the auctioneer told the bidders there was a letter from the council that they should first read before bidding. McGuigan did not read the letter, and was the winning bidder at the auction for $37,000.

Later, when he read the letter, which concerned defects to the exterior cladding, that needed to be rectified before the building consent would be granted, with an estimated cost of up to $14,000, he canceled the contract and sought the refund of his $37,000 deposit.

The Cullinanes claimed it was not a substantial breach to justify the cancelling of the sale contract, adding that the argument was immaterial anyway, as they claimed one of the letters by McGuigan's solicitors discussing settlement amounted to affirmation.

In the District Court, it was ruled the solicitors letter amounted to affirmation of the contract. However, on appeal, the High Court ruled that the contents of the letter could have been interpreted in numerous ways, setting aside the affirmation ruling, and instead ruling that the defects involved were substantial in nature, and that McGuigan was entitled to cancel the contract, and was duly awarded a refund of his deposit.

The Cullianes appealed.

Held
The court dismissed the appeal.

References

New Zealand contract case law
1999 in New Zealand law
Court of Appeal of New Zealand
1999 in case law